Joel González Bonilla (born 30 September 1989) is a taekwondo practitioner from Spain. He won the gold medal at the 2012 Olympics in the  58 kg division and the bronze medal at the 2016 Olympics in the  68 kg category.

González took up taekwondo at his father's gym Tae Sport. He has a degree in administration from the Technical University of Cartagena.

References

External links

Profile from The-Sports.org

1989 births
Living people
People from Figueres
Sportspeople from the Province of Girona
Olympic gold medalists for Spain
Olympic bronze medalists for Spain
Spanish male taekwondo practitioners
Taekwondo practitioners at the 2012 Summer Olympics
Taekwondo practitioners at the 2016 Summer Olympics
Olympic medalists in taekwondo
Olympic taekwondo practitioners of Spain
Medalists at the 2012 Summer Olympics
Medalists at the 2016 Summer Olympics
Taekwondo practitioners at the 2015 European Games
European Games medalists in taekwondo
European Games bronze medalists for Spain
Universiade medalists in taekwondo
Universiade bronze medalists for Spain
European Taekwondo Championships medalists
World Taekwondo Championships medalists
Medalists at the 2015 Summer Universiade
21st-century Spanish people